Nicola Canali (6 June 1874 – 3 August 1961) was an Italian cardinal of the Roman Catholic Church. He served as president of the Pontifical Commission for Vatican City State from 1939 and as Major Penitentiary from 1941 until his death, and was elevated to the cardinalate in 1935. He was Grand Master of the Order of the Holy Sepulchre of Jerusalem, a prestigious papal order of knighthood.

Biography
Canali was born in Rieti to Marquis Filippo Canali and his wife, the Countess Leonetta Vincentini. After studying at the Pontifical Gregorian University and the Pontifical University of Saint Thomas Aquinas, Angelicum in Rome, he was ordained to the priesthood on 31 March 1900 in the Lateran Basilica. On 1 September 1903, Canali was made private secretary to Cardinal Rafael Merry del Val and entered the Roman Curia, in the Secretariat of State. He was raised to the rank of Privy Chamberlain of His Holiness in November of that same year.

On 21 March 1908, Monsignor Canali was appointed Substitute for General Affairs, or deputy, of the Secretary of State. He was made a Domestic Prelate of His Holiness on the following 23 March, and later Secretary of the Sacred Congregation of Ceremonies on 24 September 1914. As Secretary, he served as the second-highest official of that dicastery, successively under the brother Cardinals Serafino Vannutelli and Vincenzo Vannutelli. Canali was named assessor of the Holy Office on 27 June 1926, and a Protonotary Apostolic on the following 15 September.

Pope Pius XI created him Cardinal-Deacon of S. Nicola in Carcere in the consistory of 16 December 1935. Canali was one of the cardinal electors in the 1939 papal conclave that selected Pope Pius XII, who appointed him the first President of the Pontifical Commission for Vatican City State on 20 March 1939.

Made Major Penitentiary on 15 October 1941, the Cardinal was appointed Pro-President of the Administration of the Patrimony of the Apostolic See in 1951 (remaining in that post until his death), and participated in the 1958 papal conclave, which resulted in the election of Pope John XXIII. In virtue of his position as Cardinal Protodeacon, he both announced Pope John's election and later crowned him on 4 November 1958. He was made Protector of the Order of the Holy Sepulchre on 16 July 1940, and later its Grand Master on 26 December 1949. In 1951, Canali sought in vain to be elected Grand Master of the Sovereign Order of Malta, but the duties of that office were incompatible with his role in the Order of the Holy Sepulchre, rendering him unable to be considered for the office. Not satisfied, Canali sought the support of the Vatican to remove the sovereign character of the Order of Malta and put it under the sole tutelage of the Holy See. His plans failed, creating a profound crisis. It took a decision of Pope Pius XII to put an end to the controversy. On 24 January 1953 Pius XII promulgated answers to two questions that had been propounded to him, "Is the Order of Malta a religious order?" and "Is the Order of Malta still sovereign?" answering in the affirmative in both cases.

In 1949, when Azione Cattolica asked permission "to sell souvenirs in St. Peter's Square", Canali refused and said that "St. Peter's is a house of prayer". This followed a case of planned pickpocketing in St. Peter's Square, and the subsequent banning of all vendors, photographers, and beggars.

Canali died from pneumonia in his Vatican apartment, at age 87. He is buried in the church of S. Onofrio al Gianicolo in Rome. He was the last non-bishop cardinal to die before Pope John XXIII issued on 15 April 1962 the motu proprio Cum gravissima, providing that thenceforth all cardinals should receive episcopal consecration. But he was not the last non-bishop cardinal, since a few, such as Avery Dulles, have obtained dispensation from this rule.

References

External links
 Cardinals of the Holy Roman Church
 Catholic-Hierarchy
 Order of Malta, 1951-1962 affair

1874 births
1961 deaths
20th-century Italian cardinals
Presidents of the Pontifical Commission for Vatican City State
Protodeacons
Economic history of the Holy See
Deaths from pneumonia in Vatican City
Grand Crosses 1st class of the Order of Merit of the Federal Republic of Germany
Major Penitentiaries of the Apostolic Penitentiary
Administration of the Patrimony of the Apostolic See
Cardinals created by Pope Pius XI
Almo Collegio Capranica alumni
Pontifical University of Saint Thomas Aquinas alumni
Grand Masters of the Order of the Holy Sepulchre